Yousif Behnam Habash (in Arabic يوسف بهنام حبش) (born June 1, 1951) is an Iraqi-born bishop of the Syriac Catholic Church. Since 2010, he has been the Eparch of Our Lady of Deliverance of Newark.

Biography

Early life and education
Born June 1, 1951 in Bakhdida, Iraq, Yousif Behnam Habash entered St. John's Seminary in Mosul in 1965 at the age of 14.  From 1970 to 1972 he performed military service in Iraq.  Thereafter, when the Mosul seminary closed, he completed his seminary studies at Charfet, Lebanon, studying at the Université Saint-Esprit de Kaslik.

Ordination and ministry
Habash was ordained a priest for the Archeparchy of Mosul on 31 August 1975  after which time he was assigned to a parish in his home town of Bakhdida and worked in youth ministry. He later served as vicar and then pastor of Sacred Heart Parish, in Basra.

In 1994, he was assigned to the Syriac Catholic Mission of North America, serving first in Newark, New Jersey and, from 2001 on, at the Church of the Sacred Heart of Jesus in West Hollywood, California.

Eparch of Our Lady of Deliverance of Newark
In April 2010, he was appointed by Pope Benedict XVI as the second eparch of the Syrian Catholic Eparchy of Our Lady of Deliverance of Newark.  He was consecrated a bishop on 11 July 2010 by his predecessor Ephrem Joseph Younan, who had been elected Patriarch of Antioch and all the East of the Syrians.

Eparch Habash's territory includes the United States, and 16,000 Syriac Catholics.

See also
 

 Dioceses of the Syrian Catholic Church
 List of Syriac Catholic Patriarchs of Antioch
 Lists of patriarchs, archbishops, and bishops
 Catholic Church hierarchy
 Catholic Church in the United States
 Historical list of the Catholic bishops of the United States
 List of Catholic bishops of the United States
 Lists of patriarchs, archbishops, and bishops

References

External links

 Eparchy of Our Lady of Deliverance Official Site

Episcopal succession

Living people
1951 births
American Eastern Catholic bishops
People from Bakhdida
Iraqi emigrants to the United States
Iraqi Eastern Catholics
Iraqi bishops
Syriac Catholic bishops
20th-century Eastern Catholic clergy
21st-century Eastern Catholic bishops
20th-century American clergy
21st-century American clergy